The Madness Peel sessions is a session recorded by Madness, a British pop/ska band, for John Peel's radio show on BBC Radio 1 recorded on 14 August 1979 and transmitted on 27 August 1979.

Release 
The EP, The Peel Sessions, was released in late 1986 by record label Strange Fruit. It features the recordings made for John Peel's show transmitted on 27 August 1979, and was recorded at the BBC Studios in Maida Vale, London, England 14 August 1979.

Track listing

References

External links 
 
 The Peel Sessions

1986 EPs
Madness (band) EPs
Madness
Albums produced by John Peel
Albums produced by Bob Sargeant